Phalangopsinae, occasionally known as spider crickets, are a subfamily of crickets in the family Phalangopsidae.  Members of Phalangopsinae are found worldwide in tropical and subtropical regions. Most species in the subfamily are nocturnal and can be found in rocky areas, near fallen wood, and the understory of forests.  Some species are gregarious, gathering in large numbers.

Taxonomy
Placement of Phalangopsinae and its genera has been controversial, with the group previously being placed family Gryllidae.  The Orthoptera Species File currently lists the following tribes and genera:

Endacustini 
Auth.: Gorochov, 1986; distribution: Australia and SW Pacific islands

 Anendacusta Gorochov, 2003
 Discotathra Gorochov, 2003
 Endacusta Brunner von Wattenwyl, 1873
 Endotaria Chopard, 1951
 Itarotathra Gorochov, 2003
 Lucienia Gorochov, 1986
 Nesitathra Otte & Rentz, 1985
 Protathra Desutter-Grandcolas, 1997
 Pseudendacusta Gorochov, 2003
 Tathra (insect) Otte & Alexander, 1983
 Zaclotathra Gorochov, 2003

Luzaropsini 
Auth.: Gorochov, 1986; distribution: Sri Lanka, Bangladesh, W. Malesia
 Larandopsis Chopard, 1924
 Luzaropsis Chopard, 1925
 Terrozacla Gorochov, 2014

Otteiini 
Auth.: Koçak & Kemal, 2009 (synonyms Cophusini, Otteini); distribution: Caribbean
 Cubacophus Ruíz-Baliú & Otte, 1997
 Dominicophus Yong, 2017
 Otteius Koçak & Kemal, 2009

Phalangopsini 
Auth.: Blanchard, 1845; distribution: widespread in tropics.

 subtribe Heterogryllina Hebard, 1928
 Aclodes Hebard, 1928
 monotypic genus Aspidogryllus A. singularis Chopard, 1933
 monotypic genus Hemicophus H. paranae Saussure, 1878
 monotypic genus Heterogryllus H.  ocellaris Saussure, 1874
 monotypic genus Howeta H. pacifica Otte & Rentz, 1985
 Phaeophilacris Walker, 1871
 Phalangacris Bolívar, 1895
 Seychellesia Bolívar, 1912
 Uvaroviella Chopard, 1923
 subtribe Indozaclina Gorochov, 2018
 monotypic genus Indozacla I. discifera (Gorochov, 2003)
 Kempiola Uvarov, 1940
 Opiliosina Desutter-Grandcolas, 2012
 Phalangopsina Chopard, 1933
 subtribe Modestozarina Gorochov, 2014
 monotypic genus Daedalonotum D. daedalum Gorochov, 2014
 Endecous Saussure, 1878
 Modestozara Gorochov, 2014
 subtribe Nemozarina Gorochov, 2014
 Anemozara Gorochov, 2014
 Lernecella Hebard, 1928
 Nemozara Gorochov, 2014
 subtribe Parendacustina Gorochov, 2014
 Arachnomimus Saussure, 1897
 Longizacla Gorochov, 2003
 Luzonogryllus Yamasaki, 1978
 Parendacustes Chopard, 1924
 subtribe Phalangopsina Blanchard, 1845
 Eidmanacris Chopard, 1956
 Phalangopsis Serville, 1831
 Philippopsis Desutter-Grandcolas, 1992
 subtribe not assigned
 Laozacla Gorochov, 2014
 Zacla Gorochov, 2003

incertae sedis

 Anophtalmotes Desutter-Grandcolas, 1995
 Antilliclodes Otte & Perez-Gelabert, 2009
 monotypic genus Dambachia D. eritheles Nischk & Otte, 2000
 monotypic genus Doposia D. tobago Otte & Perez-Gelabert, 2009
 monotypic genus† Eotrella E. mira Gorochov, 2012
 monotypic genus† Eozacla Gorochov, 2012
 monotypic genus Hirpinus H. afer Stål, 1855
 Kumalorina Otte & Perez-Gelabert, 2009
 Larandeicus Chopard, 1937
 monotypic genus Phaeogryllus P. fuscus Bolívar, 1912
 monotypic genus Prosecogryllus P. nossibianus Brancsik, 1892
 monotypic genus Socotracris S. kleukersi Felix & Desutter-Grandcolas, 2012
 monotypic genus Speluncasina S. annandalei (Chopard, 1928)
 monotypic genus Zaora Z. morbillosa Walker, 1869

References

External links

Crickets
Orthoptera subfamilies